Roy Hay may refer to:

 Roy Hay (horticulturist) (1910–1989), English horticultural journalist and broadcaster
 Roy Hay (musician) (born 1961), British keyboard player and member of Culture Club